Granville Centre is a rural Canadian community located in Annapolis County on the north shore of the Annapolis River in western Nova Scotia. The community is named after John Carteret, 2nd Earl Granville.

References

Communities in Annapolis County, Nova Scotia